Reugny may refer to the following places in France:

 Reugny, Allier, a commune in the department of Allier
 Reugny, Indre-et-Loire, a commune in the department of Indre-et-Loire
 Frasnay-Reugny, a commune in the department of Nièvre